2021 Rugby League World Cup qualifying may refer to:
 2021 Men's Rugby League World Cup qualifying, the methods in which teams qualified for the 2021 Men's Rugby League World Cup
 2021 Women's Rugby League World Cup qualifying, the methods in which teams qualified for the 2021 Women's Rugby League World Cup
 2021 Wheelchair Rugby League World Cup qualifying, the methods in which teams qualified for the 2021 Wheelchair Rugby League World Cup

See also 
 2021 Rugby League World Cup (disambiguation)
 World cup of rugby (disambiguation)